William "Bill" Griffith (born April 14, 1947 in Cobourg) is a Canadian retired slalom canoeist who competed in the 1970s. He finished 19th in the C-1 event at the 1972 Summer Olympics in Munich.

References

External links 
 William GRIFFITH at CanoeSlalom.net

1947 births
Canadian male canoeists
Canoeists at the 1972 Summer Olympics
Living people
Olympic canoeists of Canada